The women's Mass Start at the 2023 KNSB Dutch Single Distance Championships in Heerenveen took place at Thialf ice skating rink on Sunday 5 February 2023. There were 20 participants who competed over 16 laps. Skaters Irene Schouten and Marijke Groenewoud qualified for the 2023 ISU World Speed Skating Championships in Heerenveen.

Result

 WDR = Withdrew
 NC = No classification
Referee: Bjórn Fetlaar.  Assistant: Wycher Bos.  Starter: Marco Hesslink  

Source:

References

Single Distance Championships
2023 Single Distance
World